Armillaria calvescens is a species of mushroom in the family Physalacriaceae. Similar in appearance to Armillaria gallica, this species is often found on maple in Canada and New England, as well as other hardwoods in the western United States. The mycelium of the fungus is bioluminescent.

See also
List of Armillaria species
List of bioluminescent fungi

References

calvescens
Bioluminescent fungi
Fungi of North America
Fungal tree pathogens and diseases
Fungi described in 1989